Michael John Creutz (born November 24, 1944) is an American theoretical physicist at Brookhaven National Laboratory specializing in lattice gauge theory and computational physics.

Background
Creutz was born in 1944 in Los Alamos, New Mexico. His father, Edward Creutz, was also a physicist and was working on the Manhattan Project to help build the atomic bomb at the time of Michael's birth.

Creutz graduated with honor with a bachelor's degree in physics from Caltech in 1966. He did his graduate work at Stanford University under a NSF Graduate Fellowship, graduating in 1970. His thesis was done at the Stanford Linear Accelerator Center and his adviser was the noted physicist Sidney Drell.

After his graduation he served shortly as a research associate at SLAC before moving to the Center for Theoretical Physics at the University of Maryland, College Park, where he was a fellow from 1970-1972. In 1972 he joined the High Energy Theory Group at Brookhaven National Laboratory, becoming a Senior Physicist in 1985 and serving as Group leader from 1984 to 1987. In 2003 he became an adjunct professor at the C. N. Yang Institute for Theoretical Physics at nearby Stony Brook University.

Research
Creutz's research spans a wide variety of topics in particle physics and mathematical physics, but he is best known for his work on lattice QCD.  His 1983 textbook Quarks, Gluons, and Lattices was the first full-length textbook on lattice QCD and is considered a classic in the field.

Creutz is a fellow of the American Physical Society and was the 2000 recipient of the Aneesur Rahman Prize for Computational Physics "for first demonstrating that properties of QCD could be computed numerically on the lattice through Monte Carlo methods, and for numerous contributions to the field thereafter." In 2009 he received a Humboldt Research Award.

Books

References

External links
latticeguy.net - personal website
Creutz's BNL website
Papers on INSPIRE-HEP
arXiv.org preprints

Living people
1944 births
21st-century American physicists
Particle physicists
California Institute of Technology alumni
Stanford University alumni
Stony Brook University faculty
Brookhaven National Laboratory staff
Theoretical physicists
Computational physicists
Fellows of the American Physical Society
Humboldt Research Award recipients
People from Los Alamos, New Mexico